Alex Massie (born March 19, 1995) is a Canadian para-snowboarder who competes in the SB-LL2 category.

Career
Massie competed at Winter X Games XIX and won a bronze medal in the adaptive snowboard-cross event. The next year at Winter X Games XX he won a silver medal in the adaptive snowboard-cross event.

He competed at the 2021 World Para Snow Sports Championships and won a silver medal in the men's dual banked slalom, and won a gold medal with Tyler Turner in the men's team event.

He represented Canada at the 2018 Winter Paralympics. He will again represent Canada at the 2022 Winter Paralympics.

Personal life
Massie had a wakeboarding accident in 2011 which resulted in him losing his left leg below the knee.

References

External links
 
 

1995 births
Living people
Canadian male snowboarders
Paralympic snowboarders of Canada
Sportspeople from Barrie
Snowboarders at the 2018 Winter Paralympics
Snowboarders at the 2022 Winter Paralympics
X Games athletes
21st-century Canadian people